Alida is an unincorporated community in Clinton Township, LaPorte County, Indiana, United States.

History
Alida had its start at the junction of the Baltimore and Ohio and Louisville, New Albany and Corydon Railroads. Alida contained a post office from 1876 until 1932.

References

Unincorporated communities in LaPorte County, Indiana
Unincorporated communities in Indiana